Halfway Run is a tributary of Rapid Run in Union County, Pennsylvania, in the United States. A number of waterlogged pingo scars occur near the stream. The lake is in the vicinity of the Halfway Run Natural Area and R.B. Winter State Park. Numerous tree species inhabit the land near the stream.

Course
Halfway Run begins in a valley in Hartley Township, near the border between that township and Lewis Township. It flows in a generally west-southwesterly direction alongside Bake Oven Mountain for virtually its entire length, receiving an unnamed tributary flowing from a spring called Boiling Spring. Eventually, the stream turns southwest and almost immediately enters Halfway Lake and reaches its confluence with Rapid Run.

Hydrology
Halfway Run is not designated as an impaired waterbody. Halfway Run is a clear stream.

Geography and geology

Halfway Run was originally part of the headwaters of Elk Creek. However, approximately one million years ago, the stream and Rapid Run moved from the Penns Creek drainage basin to the West Branch Susquehanna River drainage basin.

A number of waterlogged pingo scars occur in the vicinity of Halfway Run. Before these pingo scars were discovered, the only known pingo scars in the United States were located on a plain in Illinois. Near the stream's headwaters, the scars appear to merge.

Watershed
The stream is entirely within the United States Geological Survey quadrangle of Hartleton.

Halfway Run is in the vicinity of the Halfway Run Natural Area. Additionally, R.B. Winter State Park is located near the stream.

History
Halfway Run was entered into the Geographic Names Information System on August 2, 1979. Its identifier in the Geographic Names Information System is 1176390.

Biology
Wild trout naturally reproduce in Halfway Run from its headwaters downstream to its mouth.

Mature forests consisting of white pines and hemlocks occur along Halfway Run. Further away from the stream, trees such as red oak, white oak, yellow birch, sugar maple, and American beech grow. Mountain laurel is also found in the area. Hemlock seedlings and larch trees also occur in a few of the drier pingo scars. Sphagnum moss and low blueberry bushes also inhabit the area and there are some wet, grassy patches.

Beavers historically made dams in the watershed of Halfway Run and one dam still impounds water.

The Halfway Run Site is listed on the Union County Natural Areas Inventory. It is inhabited by a federally endangered bulrush and is also used as a breeding ground for amphibians. There are a number of vernal pools at the site.

See also
 Yankee Run, next tributary of Rapid Run going upstream
 List of rivers of Pennsylvania

References 

Rivers of Union County, Pennsylvania
Tributaries of Buffalo Creek (West Branch Susquehanna River)
Rivers of Pennsylvania